The Roberts House is a historic house at 59 Prospect Street in Reading, Massachusetts.  The two-story house is basically Colonial Revival in character, but also exhibits Craftsman style features, including extended eaves with exposed rafter ends, stucco walls, and a chunky entrance portico.  The window above the entrance is a Shingle style band of three casement windows, and there is a hip-roof dormer in the roof above.  The house is one of Reading's better examples of Craftsman architecture, and was built in 1911, during a building boom on the town's west side.

The house was listed on the National Register of Historic Places in 1984.

See also
National Register of Historic Places listings in Reading, Massachusetts
National Register of Historic Places listings in Middlesex County, Massachusetts

References

Houses on the National Register of Historic Places in Reading, Massachusetts
Houses in Reading, Massachusetts
1911 establishments in Massachusetts